Piotr Malinowski (born 25 March 1984 in Częstochowa) is a Polish professional footballer who plays as a midfielder for Raków Częstochowa II.

Honours
Raków Częstochowa
Polish Cup: 2020–21

References

External links
 

1984 births
Living people
Górnik Zabrze players
Polish footballers
Sportspeople from Częstochowa
Association football forwards
Raków Częstochowa players
Podbeskidzie Bielsko-Biała players
Ekstraklasa players
I liga players
II liga players
III liga players
IV liga players